Ripollès is a comarca (county) in Catalonia, Spain. It is located in the Ribes and Camprodon river valleys. In 2001, its population was 25,744, about 40% of whom lived in the capital, Ripoll.

Ripollès borders the comarques of Baixa Cerdanya, Berguedà, Osona, Garrotxa, and – across the border in France – Vallespir, Conflent, and Alta Cerdanya.

Municipalities

See also
Sub-Pyrenees

References

External links
Official comarcal web site (in Catalan and Spanish)

 
Comarques of the Province of Girona
Pyrenees